Penye is a rural locality (a village) in Shemogodskoye Rural Settlement, Velikoustyugsky District, Vologda Oblast, Russia. The population was 6 as of 2002. There are 6 streets.

Geography 
The distance to Veliky Ustyug is 31 km, to Aristovo is 15 km. Podberezye is the nearest rural locality.

References 

Rural localities in Velikoustyugsky District